The 2018–19 Israeli Basketball Premier League, for sponsorship reasons Ligat Winner, is the 65th season of the Israeli Basketball Premier League. Maccabi Tel Aviv is the defending champion.

Teams

Hapoel Be'er Sheva was promoted from the Liga Leumit, after they swept Maccabi Kiryat Gat 3–0 in the finals. Meanwhile, Maccabi Haifa was relegated after finishing in the last place the previous season.

Stadia and locations

Personnel and sponsorship

Managerial changes

Regular season

League table

Results

Rounds 1 to 22

Rounds 23 to 33

Playoffs
The first round of the playoffs is played in a best-of-five format, with the higher seeded team playing the first, third and fifth game at home. The Playoffs started on May 23, 2019.

|}

Final Four

All-Star Event
The 2019 Israeli League All-star event was held at the Menora Mivtachim Arena in Tel Aviv on 12 April 2019.

The International team won the game 134–130. The MVP of the game was JP Tokoto who scored 19 points along with five rebounds.

Guy Pnini won the Three-Point Shootout  and Cor-J Cox won the Slam Dunk Contest.

Lineups

 Special roster addition.

Game

Three-Point Shootout

Slam Dunk Contest

Statistical leaders

|  style="width:50%; vertical-align:top;"|

Assists

|}
|}

|  style="width:50%; vertical-align:top;"|

Efficiency

|}
|}

Other statistics

Source: Basket.co.il

Individual game highs

Source: RealGM

Awards

Yearly awards

Finals MVP

Source: basket.co.il

Regular season MVP

Source: basket.co.il

Coach of the Year

Source: basket.co.il

All-Israeli League Teams

Source: basket.co.il

Quarterfinals MVP

Source: basket.co.il

Best Defender

Source: basket.co.il

Most Improved Player

Source: basket.co.il

Sixth Man of the Year

Source: basket.co.il

Rising Star

Source: basket.co.il

Monthly Awards

Player of the Month

Israeli Player of the Month

Coach of the Month

MVP of the Round

Israeli clubs in European competitions

See also
2018–19 Israeli Basketball National League
2018–19 Israeli Basketball State Cup
2018 Israeli Basketball League Cup

References

Israeli Basketball Premier League seasons
Israeli
Basketball